The men's K-4 1000 metres event was a fours kayaking event conducted as part of the Canoeing at the 1976 Summer Olympics program.

Medalists

Results

Heats
The 20 crews first raced in three heats on July 29. The top three finishers from each of the heats advanced directly to the semifinals while the remaining 11 teams were relegated to the repechage heats.

Repechages
Taking place on July 29, The top three competitors in each of the two repechages advanced to the semifinals.

Semifinals
The top three finishers in each of the three semifinals (raced on July 31) advanced to the final.

Final
The final was held on July 31.

The Soviets, third at the 750 meter mark, edged out Spain who was the surprise winner in this event at the 1975 ICF Canoe Sprint World Championships.

References
1976 Summer Olympics official report Volume 3. pp. 182–3. 
Sports-reference.com 1976 K-4 1000 m results.
Wallechinsky, David and Jaime Loucky (2008). "Canoeing: Men's Kayak Fours 1000 Meters". In The Complete Book of the Olympics: 2008 Edition. London: Aurum Press Limited. p. 477.

Men's K-4 1000
Men's events at the 1976 Summer Olympics